Sleep/Holiday is the last album by Gorky's Zygotic Mynci, released in 2003.

Track listing
"Waking for Winter" – 3:26
"Happiness" – 3:21
"Mow the Lawn" – 3:06
"Single to Fairwater" – 4:59
"Shore Light" – 3:32
"Country" – 1:46
"Eyes of Green, Green, Green" – 3:24
"The South of France" – 2:51
"Leave My Dreaming" – 4:08
"Only Takes a Night" – 6:36
"Pretty as a Bee" – 9:28
"Red Rocks" – 4:44

References

External links
 

2003 albums
Gorky's Zygotic Mynci albums